The 2013–14 season was East Bengal's 94th season since its formation in 1920.

Key events
12 June 2013: Brazilian Marcos Falopa succeeds Trevor Morgan as the head coach.
6 July 2013: The club signed James Moga from Pune FC who became their second foreigner.
15 July 2013: The club revealed Ryuji Sueoka as their fourth foreigner.
17 September 2013: They continue their winning streak in the AFC Cup by beating Semen Padang. AIFF General Secretary Kushal Das congratulated the club on the behalf of entire AIFF.
24 September 2013: East Bengal drew with Semen and secured the semi-final stages, becoming the second Indian club to do so. They will meet Al-Kuwait.
14 November 2013: East Bengal appoint Armando Colaco as their new head coach.

Transfers 

In:

Out:

First-team squad

Competitions

Overall

Overview

Calcutta Football League

Table

Fixtures & results

I-League

Table

Fixtures & results

Federation Cup

Group B

Fixtures & results

IFA Shield

Group A

Fixtures & results

AFC Cup

Knock-out Stage

Fixtures & results

Statistics

Appearances 
Players with no appearances are not included in the list.

Goal scorers

References

East
East Bengal Club seasons